Ibotta is an American mobile technology company based in Denver, Colorado that provides cashback rebates to users for shopping at stores or purchasing products from companies that pay Ibotta a fee.

History 
Ibotta was founded by current CEO Bryan Leach in 2012. Jim Clark is an investor and board member.

As of 2016, Ibotta had received over $73 million in funding. In August 2019, the company announced that it had raised its valuation to $1 billion, following a round of Series D funding. The round was led by Koch Disruptive Technologies, a subsidiary of Koch Industries. The amount of money raised was not disclosed, but followed three rounds of funding that totaled $85 million.

By 2019, it was reported that the Ibotta app had been downloaded more than 30 million times and had given users $500 million in rewards money.

The company partners with brands and retailers to offer rebates and discounts on consumer packaged goods, retail purchases, and restaurant dining through a mobile app, similar to traditional coupons or rebates. Ibotta also has cash back and rebates on alcohol (wine, beer, and spirits) that can be purchased at bars, restaurants, and liquor and grocery stores. Ibotta users must be of legal drinking age, even if the consumer has no intention of purchasing beer or wine, or if they patronize a business that does not sell such items.

The app is available on both iOS and Android devices and is available only in the United States as of October 2016. Ibotta claims to work at over 500,000 locations within the United States. In 2019, the company introduced Pay with Ibotta, a way to pay for purchases using gift cards while receiving cash back rewards.

In November 2020, Ibotta became the official jersey patch partner of the New Orleans Pelicans.

Notable dates 
 Company incorporated October 31, 2011.
 App launched to both the App Store and Google Play stores in 2012.
 Dynamic Segmentation was launched in partnership with LiveRamp in May 2016.
 In July 2016 Ibotta app announced it had paid users over $100 million through its rebates.

References

External links 
 

Business organizations based in the United States
Mobile technology companies
Cashback and rebate
Mobile applications